The Cooper T53 is a Formula One car built by British motorsport team Cooper for the 1960 Formula One season. Jack Brabham drove it to his second World Championship that year, and with teammate Bruce McLaren gave Cooper its second Constructors' Championship.

Design and development history
The T53 was lower and slimmer than its predecessor, the Cooper T51. It was equipped with a new tubular steel frame clad in aluminium panels. Suspension was by double wishbones, coil springs and telescopic dampers all round, a change from Cooper's usual transverse leaf spring at the rear. Power came from the latest version of 2.5 litre Climax FPF which developed around 240 bhp and drove the rear wheels through a Cooper five-speed gearbox.

Racing history
In its first race, Jack Brabham drove the new Cooper race car to second place in the International Trophy at Silverstone in May. At its first World Championship event at Monaco, Brabham qualified second but in the race itself he was disqualified after spinning off and then receiving a push start. Bruce McLaren put in a strong race, finishing second to Stirling Moss.

Thereafter, Brabham reeled off five wins in a row to tie up the World Championship with two events to spare. McLaren was runner-up, and Cooper won the Constructors' Championship. Brabham also won the non-championship Silver City Trophy.

In 1961 Cooper turned to the T55 but the T53 became a big sales success for the Cooper team, with no less than eight teams running it. Most teams ran the car with the 1.5 litre Climax FPF Mk. II to comply with the new F1 regulations, but Scuderia Centro Sud sourced a Maserati engine instead. Although they had some success in non-championship events, the privateers were largely outclassed in the 1961 World Championship.

The T53 was also used by various teams in the short-lived Intercontinental Formula in 1961. Stirling Moss and Jack Brabham won all five races in the series with the car, fitted with a 2.7 litre version of the FPF engine. Several examples also made their way to Australia and New Zealand and took part in the Tasman Series.

Complete Formula One World Championship results

(key)

References

Cooper Formula One cars
Tasman Series cars
Formula One championship-winning cars